is a single-member electoral district for the House of Representatives, the lower house of the National Diet of Japan. It is located in Sapporo, the prefectural capital of Hokkaido and consists of the Higashi ("East") ward and most of the Kita ("North") ward.

The current Representative is Kenko Matsuki, member of the CDP. He won the seat in a special election in April 2021 and was reelected in the general election later that year.
Matsuki was formerly a representative of the Hokkaido 12th district.

The Representative from the district from 2012 to 2020 was Liberal Democrat Takamori Yoshikawa. In 2020 he resigned due to accusations of accepting bribes during his time as Agriculture Minister. Yoshikawa had lost the previous three elections to Democrat Wakio Mitsui. Yoshikawa had been the LDP candidate in the 2nd district since the initial election of 1996, but only won the district in 2000 (he won a Hokkaidō proportional seat on the LDP list in 1996 and 2005). Mitsui had contested the 3rd district for the NFP in 1996, but ranked third behind candidates from LDP and DPJ; in 2000, he ran only as a candidate on the DPJ proportional list and won a seat, before taking over the DPJ candidacy in the 2nd district in 2003.

Before the introduction of the current first-past-the-post/proportional representation parallel electoral system for the House of Representatives in the 1990s, Sapporo city had been part of the SNTV six-member 1st district.

List of representatives

Recent results

References 

Politics of Hokkaido
Districts of the House of Representatives (Japan)